Benito Serrano Jiménez  (19 March 1850 – 23 December 1945) was a Costa Rican politician and judge.

Serrano was born in San José, Costa Rica, to Anastasio Serrano y Valdivieso of New Granada and Juanita Jiménez y Castro. He married Celina Thompson McQuillen from Great Britain. In 1876 he graduated with a law degree from the Universidad de Santo Tomas.

During his career he served as Mayor of San José, Assistant Secretary of Treasury, Commerce and Public Instruction, Subpromotor prosecutor, Criminal Administrative Judge, Magistrate of the First Chamber of Appeals, and Magistrate of the Court of Cassation.

In 1915, Serrano was elected President of the Supreme Court of Justice of Costa Rica to complete Alejandro Alvarado García's term.

1850 births
1945 deaths
20th-century Costa Rican judges
People from San José, Costa Rica
Mayors of places in Costa Rica
Supreme Court of Justice of Costa Rica judges
19th-century Costa Rican lawyers